Admiral D. A. Mohan R. Samarasekara, VSV, USP, ndc, psc, SLN was the 13th Commander of the Sri Lankan Navy. 

Having joined the Royal Ceylon Navy as an officer cadet in 1971, he received his training at Britannia Royal Naval College in Dartmouth and was commissioned as an acting sub lieutenant. He later attended the Defence Services Staff College, Wellington and the National Defence College, New Delhi. 

Rear Admiral Samarasekara was serving as Chief of Staff of the navy when commander of the navy, Vice Admiral Clancy Fernando was assassinated by a LTTE suicide bomber on 16 November 1992. That day, Samarasekara took over as acting commander of the navy and was confirmed in the post and promoted to Vice Admiral. His tenure saw the continuation of aggressive naval operations against LTTE activity at sea, denying them free movement in the coastal waters effecting their gun running operations. As such when the LTTE and the newly elected government started peace negotiations in 1994, the LTTE withdrew from the peace talks a few months later by attacking larger fleet elements of the navy in Trincomalee. He retired on 27 November 1997 and was promoted to the rank of Admiral. He was succeeded by H. C. A. C. Thisera. Following his retirement he served as the Chairman, Sri Lanka Ports Authority.

References

Commanders of the Navy (Sri Lanka)
Sri Lankan admirals
Sinhalese military personnel
1948 births
Living people
National Defence College, India alumni
Defence Services Staff College alumni